Robert Guéï (16 March 1941 – 19 September 2002) was the military ruler of the Ivory Coast from 24 December 1999 to 26 October 2000.

Biography
Guéï was born in Kabakouma, a village in the western Man Department, and was a member of the Yacouba ethnic community. He was a career soldier: under the French administration, he was trained at the Ouagadougou military school and the St Cyr military school in France. He was an ardent supporter of longtime President Félix Houphouët-Boigny, who in 1990 appointed him chief of the army following a mutiny. After the death of Houphouët-Boigny in 1993, Guéï became distanced from the new leader Henri Konan Bédié. Guéï's refusal to mobilize his troops to resolve a political struggle between Bédié and the opposition leader Alassane Ouattara in October 1995 led to his dismissal. He was made a minister but sacked again in August 1996 and forced out of the army in January 1997.

Bédié was overthrown in a coup on Christmas Eve, 1999. Although Guéï had no role in the coup, the popular general was encouraged out of retirement to head the junta until the next elections. On 4 January 2000, he became President of the Republic.  Guéï stood in the October 2000 presidential election as an independent. He only allowed one opposition candidate, Laurent Gbagbo of the Ivorian Popular Front, to run against him. Guéï was soundly defeated by Gbagbo but refused to recognize the result. It took a spate of street protests to bring Gbagbo to power.  Guéï fled to Gouessesso, near the Liberian border, but remained a figure in the political scene. He was included in a reconciliation forum in 2001 and agreed to refrain from undemocratic methods.

Guéï withdrew from the forum agreement in September 2002, but was killed along with his wife, former First Lady Rose Doudou Guéï, and their children on 19 September 2002, in the Cocody district of Abidjan at the first hours of the civil war. The circumstances of his death remain mysterious, although generally attributed to forces loyal to Laurent Gbagbo. Several members of his family and the interior minister, Émile Boga Doudou, were also killed.

Following Guéï's death, his body stayed in a morgue until a funeral was held for him in Abidjan on 18 August 2006, nearly four years after his death.

See also
 First Ivorian Civil War

References

1941 births
2002 deaths
Presidents of Ivory Coast
Assassinated Ivorian politicians
People murdered in Ivory Coast
People from Montagnes District
Ivorian military personnel
Government ministers of Ivory Coast
Independent politicians in Ivory Coast
2000s murders in Ivory Coast
2002 crimes in Ivory Coast
2002 murders in Africa